The 1552 Act for the Provision and Relief of the Poor was a statute passed by the Parliament of England during the reign of King Edward VI.  It is a part of the Tudor Poor Laws and reaffirms previous poor laws enacted in 1536, 1547, and 1549 which focused primarily on the punishment of vagabonds.
The Poor Act of 1552 designated a new position, "collector of alms," in each parish.  Local authorities and residents elected two alms collectors to request, record, and distribute charitable donations for poor relief.  It further provided that each parish would keep a register of all its “impotent, aged, and needy persons” and the aid they received. Parish authorities were directed to “gently exhort” any person that could contribute but would not, referring them to the Bishop of the Diocese if they continued to refuse. Punishment for neglecting poor relief obligations was adopted in 1563 and reliance on charity was replaced by a system of taxation in 1597.  Under the assumption that all poor would be cared for, begging openly was now forbidden.  Licensed begging would be reinstated by the Marian Parliament of 1555 with the requirement that legal beggars wear badges.

Social context 
During the Tudor period, cultural perceptions began to shift away from the medieval theological belief that poverty was a virtue.  The philosophical influence of Renaissance humanism and the emergence of a Protestant work ethic and rogue literature contributed to views encouraging industriousness and the stewardship of wealth and vilifying idleness, begging, and vagrancy.  As poverty rates and the costs of poor relief rose, communities attempted to define and limit who qualified for aid, restricting support by locality and moral conduct.

Economic context 
The rise of poverty rates during the Tudor period can be attributed to a confluence of factors.  Rebellions in 1549 hampered harvest efforts and crop shortages in the following years contributed to price inflation. A series of coin debasements between 1544-1551 undermined economic confidence. Rapid population growth and the effects of Tudor enclosure policies led to the supply of labor exceeding demand and agricultural and industrial wages falling sharply. High birth-rates also meant a large percentage of the population were too young to contribute economically. Additionally, the dissolution of the monasteries removed all Catholic Church-operated charities, religious guilds, and lay fraternities that provided formal and informal aid and confiscated parish lands and livestock which had also been used to provide poor relief.  The process of replacing these institutions was often slow and uneven.

References

English Poor Laws
Tudor England
1552 in law
1552 in England